is a town and municipality in Vestfold in Vestfold og Telemark county, Norway—located along the Oslofjord.  The administrative centre of the municipality is the town of Horten.  The municipality also includes the town of Åsgårdstrand and the villages of Borre, Skoppum, and Nykirke.

The town of Horten was separated from the municipality of Borre to become a municipality of its own in 1858. The neighboring municipalities of Borre and Horten were merged back together on 1 January 1988. The name of the new united municipality was first Borre, but after a referendum it was changed to Horten on 1 June 2002. The local newspaper in Horten is named Gjengangeren, and covers mostly local news. It is also available online (see external links section).

Borre National Park contains the largest known burial site in Scandinavia. It also has the largest collection of king's graves in Scandinavia.

General information

The nearest train station in Horten is Skoppum. Skoppum is 1 hour and 10 minutes by train from Oslo Central Station. By car Horten is reached by following European route E18 south, and is approx.  from Oslo. The nearest airport is Sandefjord Airport Torp which is located about 30 minutes by train south of Skoppum.

Name
The town is named after the old Horten farm (called "Hortan" in 1552), since it is built on the same ground. The name seems to be the definite form of hort m 'bulge' (but here in a weak form, Norse *horti). Several hills and mountains in Norway have the name Horten (or Horta, femininum), and here it could be referring to the hill Brårudåsen lying in the middle of the town.

Coat-of-arms
The coat-of-arms is from relatively modern times.  They were granted on 19 November 1907.  The arms were granted when Horten received city status. The arms use the old "English"-style of shield that is divided diagonally in a "party per bend" style with a mural crown on top signifying its city status.  The lower part of the arms show the importance of the city as a naval port. The upper part shows a rose as a symbol for the nature around the city.

Geography
Horten is a city and municipality on the western shore of the Oslo Fjord in Vestfold County. It borders with Åsgårdstrand in the south, and to Re in both the west and north. Neighboring towns are Tønsberg in the south and the much smaller Holmestrand in the north. About half of the municipality's total area is made up of forests, while slightly less than a third is agricultural land. The administrative centre of the municipality is the city of Horten. Smaller towns include Åsgårdstrand, Skoppum, and Nykirke.

Nature preserves
Nature preserves include Vealøs, Adalstjern, Frebergsvik and Falkensten. Additional nature preserves are found by Borrevannet, Løvøya, Bastøy, and in the village of Åsgårdstrand. Falkenstendammen is a wildlife preserve, home to various nationally threatened species. Reverompa Plant Reserve was established in 2006 due to presence of the nationally endangered crested cow-wheat. Tordenskjoldeika is a protected 700-year-old oak tree by the harbor.

Demographics

Besides the city of Horten proper with a 2016 population of 20,301, the municipality is also home to three villages: The Horten part of Åsgårdstrand (2016 pop. 2,953), Skoppum (1,692), and Nykirke (715). The population growth in the municipality is lower than the county average; Horten had a population growth of 13.2% in 2000–2015, while Vestfold County had a population growth of 14.0%. Horten is one of Norway's most densest municipalities with a population density of 384/km2 as of 2015.

Economy

Horten's employment sector is made up of industry (21.7% as of 2014), health- and social services (18.1%), education (12.1%), and commerce and auto-repair (12.7%). The Royal Norwegian Navy was traditionally an important industry, but the city experienced an economic change when the Navy moved its main base to Bergen, and Horten Verft went bankrupt in 1987. Currently, one of the most important industries is electrical engineering, represented by companies such as Kongsberg Maritime, Kongsberg Norcontrol, Simrad Horten, GE Vingmed Ultrasound, and others.

Culture
Åsgårdstrand has been a vacation and bathing destination since 1920. It had already become an artists' colony by then, attracting painters such as Edvard Munch and Fritz Thaulow. Edvard Munch spent a total of seven summers at his vacation home in Åsgårdstrand, known as Munchs Lille Hus ("Munch's Little House"). The house is now a museum, located on Munch's Street (Munchsgate 25).

Borre mounds

Borrehaugene (from Borre, the name of a local village and haugene from the old Norse Word haugr meaning mound) was the first national park to be founded in Norway. Borre  National Park is situated between Horten and Åsgårdstrand. The site provides important historical knowledge, and can be seen as evidence that there was a center of power here in the Viking Age. The excavations also uncovered an unusually good selection of craft work, much of which is on display in Oslo at the Viking Ship Museum. This style has become known as "Borre style" and is, today, known for its animal and knot ornaments, which were often used for decorating harnesses. The finds also confirm that there was a Viking ship buried at Borrehaugene.

The Borre mound cemetery at Borre National Park contains graves of kings dating back to the Migration Period. These burial mounds may represent North Europe's most extensive collection of graves of the old Scandinavian Yngling dynasty. From 1989 to 1991, new excavations were undertaken both in and around the national park.

Transportation

Being located out on a peninsula, most major transportation arteries go to the west of Horten, and secondary roads connect the city to these routes. The Moss–Horten Ferry (also known as the Bastø Ferry) crosses the Oslofjord, connecting to Moss in Østfold. The ferry departs 1–4 times per hour, and the journey takes about 30 minutes. The ferry transports annually about 1.8 million vehicles and 3.5 million passengers.

The railway line Vestfoldbanen passes through the Horten municipality, but not through the main city center. Skoppum Station is located southwest of the downtown, although several commuters prefer to use Holmestrand Station due to better road access.

Sports
Horten has several football clubs. The most successful and well known is FK Ørn-Horten, which currently plays in the Norwegian 2nd Division. Another Horten team, Falk, plays 3rd division, while Borre and Holtankammeratene plays further down in the leagues.

Education 
Close to Horten is the University College Høgskolen i Buskerud og Vestfold, commonly referred to as Bakkenteigen, which offers a wide range of subjects from sociology, history and language thru mathematics, nature science and maritime studies. Bakkenteigen has over 4,000 students and aims to be a resource for research and development in the region.

Sites of interest

 Borre National Park, the first national park in Norway. It is home to Northern Europe's largest collection of royal grave mounds, and it is the largest grave mound site in Northern Europe.
 Marinemuseet, the Royal Norwegian Navy Museum, is the oldest existing museum of its kind in the world, founded in 1853. At the Royal Norwegian Navy Museum you can find many ships, including , the world's first torpedo boat from 1873.
 Preus Fotomuseum, The Norwegian Museum of Photography, is a unique museum located in the same building as the naval museum.
 The Naval Base - Horten has a naval base named Karljohansvern. Activity there in the recent years have been decreasing and parts of the area have now been opened to the public, including some nice beaches. Both the museum of photography and the navy museum are located close to the naval base.
The Royal Norwegian Navy Band is a military band ranked among the best in Europe has its home base in Karljohansvern in Horten.
 Horten Bilmuseum, the classic car museum, houses a variety of classic cars ranging from 1900 to the 1970s. One of Norway's largest model railways is also on display in the museum. It is open every day during summer, Sundays only from the middle of August to the middle of June.
 Borre Golfbane is a golf course has hosted two Challenge Tour events (1994 and 1998) and was in 2005 extended to 27 holes of full length (par 72 + par 36). The first Challenge Tour event in 1994 was the first professional golf tournament on Norwegian soil. The 18-hole course runs along lake Borrevannet and some of the holes have views over the lake.
 Lake Borrevannet is home to a national bird sanctuary where 255 different bird species have been observed (2003 numbers). 110 species have been confirmed using the lake as their nesting place.
 L'Esprit d'Edvard Munch is the northernmost vineyard of the world, operating in Horten.
 Åsgårdstrand, in the southern part of the municipality, is a sight of its own. It is a small, white-painted ocean town that is best known for its great painters (like the aforementioned Edvard Munch) and its beaches.

Notable residents

Public Service 
 Mathias Sigwardt (1770 in Borre – 1840) priest and Bishop of Christianssand
 Christian Torber Hegge Geelmuyden (1816–1885) naval officer & Mayor of Horten 1857/1864
 Francis Hagerup (1853–1921) a Norwegian law professor, diplomat & Prime Minister of Norway from 1895 to 1898 and from 1903 to 1905; grew up in Horten
 Kristine Munch (1873 in Horten – 1959) an early female Norwegian physician
 Thorstein H. H. Thoresen (1885 in Horten – 1956) Lieutenant Governor of North Dakota
 Jan B. Jansen (1898 in Horton – 1984) physician, anatomist and brain researcher; in the WWII Norwegian resistance
 Finn Ronne (1899 in Horten – 1980) a U.S. citizen and Antarctic explorer
 Arne Skaug (1906 in Horten – 1974) an economist, civil servant, diplomat and politician
 Gunnar Syverstad (1910 in Horten – 1945) assisted the Norwegian heavy water sabotage
 Grethe Rytter Hasle (1920 in Borre – 2013) was a Norwegian planktologist
 Arnoldus Schytte Blix (born 1946 in Borre) a Norwegian zoologist and Arctic explorer
 Nils Henning Hontvedt (born 1952) a politician, Mayor of Horten from 2001 to 2011

The Arts 

 Lagertha Broch (1864 in Horten – 1952) an illustrator, children's writer and proponent for women's rights
 William Ivarson (1867 in Horton – 1934) a Norwegian theatre actor 
 Eidé Norena (1884 in Horten – 1968) a Norwegian soprano and actress 
 Per Krohg (1889 in Åsgårdstrand – 1965) artist of the mural for the UN Security Council
 Bjorn Egeli (1900 in Horten – 1984) an American portrait painter and maritime artist
 Paul Lorck Eidem (1909 in Horten – 1992) a writer and illustrator, grew up on Bastøy
 Astrid Hjertenæs Andersen (1915 in Horten – 1985) a Norwegian poet and travel-writer
 Eva Gustavson (1917 at Oslofjord — 2009) a Norwegian-American contralto in operas
 Leif Preus (1928 in Horten – 2013) a photographer, founded the Preus Museum in 1976
 Joachim Calmeyer (1931 in Horten – 2016) a Norwegian actor, grew up in Horten 
 Sigurd Jansen (born 1932 in Horten) a Norwegian composer, pianist and conductor
 Vidar Lønn-Arnesen (born 1940 in Horten) Norwegian singer, radio and TV presenter
 Grethe Kausland (1947 in Horten – 2007) a Norwegian singer, performer and actress 
 Geir Langslet (born 1956 in Horten) a Norwegian jazz pianist and band leader
 Marie Ulven Ringheim (born 1999 in Horten) known as Girl in Red, an indie pop singer-songwriter

Sport 
 Herman Smith-Johannsen (1875 in Horten – 1987) a supercentenarian skier, introduced cross-country skiing to Canada and North America
 Gil Andersen (1879 in Horten – 1930) a Norwegian-American racecar driver
 Harry Boye Karlsen (1920 in Horten – 1994) a footballer with 58 caps for Norway
 Per Bredesen (born 1930) a former footballer with 276 club caps and 18 for Norway

International relations

Twin towns — Sister cities
The following cities are twinned with Horten:
  Hillerød, Region Hovedstaden, Denmark
  Karlskrona, Blekinge County, Sweden
  Loviisa, Southern Finland, Finland
  Ólafsfjörður, Fjallabyggð, Iceland

References

External links

 Municipal fact sheet from Statistics Norway
 
 The Naval Museum  
 Museum of Photography
 Local History Museum 
 VisitHorten.com
 Gjengangeren - the local newspaper of Horten 
 Horten bilmuseum  (the classic car museum) 
 Borre Golfbane (Borre Golf Course)

 
Municipalities of Vestfold og Telemark
Populated places in Vestfold og Telemark
Port cities and towns in Norway
Port cities and towns of the North Sea
Populated places established in 1858
1858 establishments in Norway